Calamaria schmidti, known commonly as Schmidt's reed snake, is a species of snake in the family Colubridae. The species is endemic to Malaysia.

Etymology
The specific name, schmidti, is in honor of American herpetologist Karl Patterson Schmidt.

Geographic range
C. schmidti is found in the Malaysian state of Sabah on the island of Borneo.

Habitat

Description
The eye is much smaller than its distance from the mouth. There are four upper labials, and there is no preocular. The frontal is five or six times as wide as a supraocular.

Diet
C. schmidti preys upon earthworms.

Reproduction
C. schmidti is oviparous.

References

Further reading
Inger RF, Marx H (1965). "The Systematics and Evolution of the Oriental Colubrid Snakes of the Genus Calamaria ". Fieldiana: Zoology 49: 1–304. (Calamaria schmidti, pp. 74–75 + Figure 1, bottom, on p. 17).
Malkmus R, Manthey U, Vogel G, Hoffmann P, Kosuch J (2002). Amphibians and Reptiles of Mount Kinabalu (North Borneo). Rugell, Liechtenstein: Serpents Tale / Gantner Verlag Kommanditgesellschaft. 404 pp. (Calamaria schmidti, p. 327).
Marx H, Inger RF (1955). "Notes on Snakes of the Genus Calamaria ". Fieldiana · Zoology 37: 167–209. (Calamaria schmidti, new species, pp. 197–199, Figure 27).

Reptiles described in 1955
Reptiles of Malaysia
Colubrids
Calamaria
Reptiles of Borneo